Sir Albert Fuller Ellis  (28 August 1869 – 11 July 1951) was a prospector in the Pacific. He discovered phosphate deposits on the Pacific islands of Nauru and Banaba (Ocean Island) in 1900. He was the British Phosphate Commissioner for New Zealand from 1921 to 1951.

Biography
Ellis was born in Roma, Queensland; his family moved to Waikato in New Zealand, where he attended the Cambridge District High School. At the age of 18, Ellis joined his brothers James and George in working for John T. Arundel and Co. Their father George C. Ellis, a chemist, and later a farmer in New Zealand, was a director of the company. John T. Arundel and Co. was engaged in Pacific trading of phosphates, copra, and pearl shell. While working in the company's Sydney office in 1899 Ellis determined that a large rock from Nauru being used as a doorstop was rich in phosphate. Following the discovery Ellis traveled to Ocean Island and Nauru and confirmed the discovery.

Operations on Ocean Island (known by the natives as Banaba) commenced three months after the discovery. Ellis managed the development of the phosphate resources on Nauru, and mining began in 1906 under an arrangement with the German administrators of the island. The native King had no jurisdiction over any lands on Banaba. Ronald Wright, in his book On Fiji Islands, writes:  

Following World War I, Nauru became a mandate of Australia, New Zealand and the United Kingdom, the countries appointed the British Phosphate Commission to manage the extraction and export of phosphate from Nauru. Ellis was appointed the BPC for New Zealand. The native population were left to the horrors of Japanese occupation in the Second World War, and then subsequently moved to the island of Rabi, since their home island had by now been completely destroyed by the mining operation instigated by Ellis.

In the 1928 New Year Honours, Ellis was appointed a Companion of the Order of St Michael and St George, and in the 1938 King's Birthday Honours was created a Knight Bachelor. Ellis wrote a book about the history of the Pacific phosphate islands, his discovery and subsequent development of the phosphate industry on the islands, Ocean Island and Nauru — their Story was published in Australia in 1935.

See also
History of Nauru

References

Books
An Encyclopaedia of New Zealand, 1966

Book Published
 

1869 births
1951 deaths
Australian emigrants to New Zealand
New Zealand Companions of the Order of St Michael and St George
New Zealand Knights Bachelor
People from Auckland
People from Roma, Queensland
Phosphate mining in Nauru